Raymond Gilliéron is a Swiss former footballer who played in the 1950s. He played as midfielder. 

Gilliéron first played for Brühl St. Gallen. He then joined FC Basel's first team for their 1954–55 season under player-coach René Bader. After playing in one test game, Gilliéron played his domestic league debut for the club in the away game on 27 February 1955 as Basel were defeated 0–1 by Bellinzona. In that season he played nine league games and he stayed at the club another year.

Between the years 1954 and 1956 Gilliéron played a total of 17 games for Basel without scoring a goal. 11 of these games were in the Nationalliga A, one was in the Swiss Cup and five were friendly games.

References

Sources
 Die ersten 125 Jahre. Publisher: Josef Zindel im Friedrich Reinhardt Verlag, Basel. 
 Verein "Basler Fussballarchiv" Homepage
(NB: Despite all efforts, the editors of these books and the authors in "Basler Fussballarchiv" have failed to be able to identify all the players, their date and place of birth or date and place of death, who played in the games during the early years of FC Basel)

FC Basel players
SC Brühl players
Swiss men's footballers
Association football midfielders